Chiaroscuro is the third album by singer Pitty. After 4 years without releasing a new album, Pitty launched Chiaroscuro on August 11, 2009.

The name 
The word comes from Italian, meaning "light and dark" is also one of the innovative techniques used in painting by Leonardo da Vinci, and is characterized by the contrast between light and shadow to represent an object, creating a three-dimensional effect, the name came in the recordings because the songs, which sometimes are more subtle and sensorial, now are more gloomy and dense.

Cover 
To produce the cover of their third album, Pitty decided to draw a panel of the studio, which was designed as they sang. The cover was painted by the illustrator, artist, designer Catherine Gushiken.

Track listing

References 

2009 albums
Pitty albums